Saint Felix of Girona (died 304) is a Catalan saint. He was martyred at Girona after traveling from Carthage with Saint Cucuphas to Spain as a missionary.

Felix was born in Scillium.  His feast day is celebrated on 1 August.

References

Catalan Roman Catholic saints
Saints from Hispania
Province of Girona
304 deaths
4th-century Christian martyrs
4th-century Romans
Year of birth unknown